Gephyrota is a genus of running crab spiders that was first described by Embrik Strand in 1932.

Species
 it contains seven species, found only in Africa, Asia, and Queensland:
Gephyrota candida (Simon, 1895) – Cambodia, Vietnam
Gephyrota glauca (Jézéquel, 1966) – Ivory Coast
Gephyrota limbata (L. Koch, 1875) (type) – Australia (Queensland)
Gephyrota nigrolineata (Simon, 1909) – Vietnam
Gephyrota pudica (Simon, 1906) – India
Gephyrota virescens (Simon, 1906) – Sri Lanka
Gephyrota viridipallida (Schmidt, 1956) – Cameroon

See also
 List of Philodromidae species

References

Araneomorphae genera
Philodromidae
Spiders of Asia
Taxa named by Embrik Strand